This is a list of the extreme points of the British Isles, the points that are farther north, south, east, west, higher or lower than any other location.

Northernmost Point — Out Stack, Shetland Islands, Scotland
Northernmost Settlement — Skaw, Unst, Shetland Islands, Scotland
Southernmost Point — Les Minquiers Reef, Jersey, Channel Islands
Southernmost Settlement — Saint Clement, Jersey, Channel Islands
Westernmost Point — Rockall, Harris, Scotland
Westernmost Settlement — Dunquin, County Kerry, Ireland
Easternmost Point — Lowestoft Ness, Suffolk, England
Easternmost Settlement — Lowestoft, Suffolk, England
Most Inland Point — Church Flatts Farm, Derbyshire, England

See also 
 Extreme points of Ireland
 Extreme points of the United Kingdom

British Isles
British Isles
Extreme points